Lemuel David Wyly, Jr. (August 9, 1916 - September 5, 2004) was an American physicist and professor of nuclear physics at the Georgia Institute of Technology. He worked on important nuclear physics experiments at the Oak Ridge National Laboratory. He did his graduate studies from UNC Chapel Hill and PhD from Yale University.  His work includes a number of notable research papers  on nuclear physics  and a book written with two co-authors. His famous students include Ed V. Hungerford III.

Wyly retired from Georgia Tech and lived in Atlanta till his death, leaving his wife Estelle Estelle Bruggemann Wyly and two children. Wyly died on September 5, 2004 at the age of 88. His wife died in 2009.

References

 http://onlinebooks.library.upenn.edu/webbin/book/lookupname?key=Wyly%2C%20L.%20D.
 https://catalog.hathitrust.org/Record/011572027
 
 https://journals.aps.org/pr/abstract/10.1103/PhysRev.76.104

1916 births
American physicists
2004 deaths
Fellows of the American Physical Society